FC Yenisey-2 Krasnoyarsk is a Russian football team based in Krasnoyarsk. It is the reserves team for FC Yenisey Krasnoyarsk. It played on amateur levels throughout its existence, before getting licensed for the third-tier Russian FNL 2 for the 2021–22 season.

Current squad
As of 22 February 2023, according to the Second League website.

References

 
Association football clubs established in 1992
Football clubs in Russia
Sport in Krasnoyarsk
1992 establishments in Russia